Flurscheim (or Flürscheim) is a surname. Notable people with the surname include:

 Herman A. Flurscheim (1851–1914), New York retailer and art collector
 Michael Flürscheim (1844–1912), German economist

See also
 Florsheim (disambiguation)